The Galápagos rice rat (Aegialomys galapagoensis), also known as the  Galápagos oryzomys, is a species of rodent that is endemic to the Galápagos Islands.

Description
It has very long, soft and dense fur that is grizzled copper-brown above and yellowish-grey on the underparts.

Distribution and habitat
The Galapagos rice rat is found only in the eastern Galapagos. Today, it occurs only on Santa Fé Island, and possibly on Santiago Island. A separate population formerly existed on San Cristóbal Island, and is considered to represent a separate subspecies, but is thought to have been extinct for many decades. Its natural habitat is subtropical or tropical dry shrubland.

Biology and behaviour
The Galapagos rice rat is primarily nocturnal, but may sometimes be active before sunset, spending the day resting in crevices beneath lava blocks or under shrubs. It is omnivorous, feeding on plant matter and insects. Like many of the animals of the Galápagos, it is tame and unafraid of humans. Scientists working on Santa Fé Island and Fernandina Island have reported that it is necessary to keep tents open to prevent these rice rats from chewing in during the night. It is also commonly seen on beaches, where it is attracted by fish remains left behind by human activity.

Breeding seems to take place primarily in the hot season with young being born between March and May, but may occur at other times of year, perhaps depending on the availability of food resources. Litters of 2–7 young are born hairless and blind, opening their eyes and developing the adult coat by day 13 after birth. The maximum lifespan in the wild has been recorded as 599 days.

Taxonomy
The species was previously placed in Oryzomys as Oryzomys galapagoensis.  The subspecies A. g. bauri from Santa Fé Island is sometimes considered to represent a full species. A. g. galapagoensis was formerly found on San Cristóbal Island, where Charles Darwin captured several live specimens on the second voyage of HMS Beagle in 1835. However, it is believed that it became extinct only decades after Darwin's visit, and the next specimens collected were subfossil remains found in lava tubes by David Steadman and colleagues in 1984. Its closest relative is Aegialomys xanthaeolus, the only other species in the genus, which is found in coastal Ecuador and Peru.

References

Aegialomys
Endemic fauna of the Galápagos Islands
Mammals described in 1839
Taxonomy articles created by Polbot